Rudolph E. Abel (May 30, 1902 – December 31, 1974) was an American film and television producer.

Selected filmography
 The Girl Who Dared (1944)
 Girls of the Big House (1945)
 A Sporting Chance (1945)
 The Fatal Witness (1945)

References

Bibliography
  Len D. Martin. The Republic Pictures Checklist: Features, Serials, Cartoons, Short Subjects and Training Films of Republic Pictures Corporation, 1935-1959. McFarland, 1998.

External links

1902 births
1974 deaths
Film producers from California
People from Maxwell, California
20th-century American businesspeople